Tutankhamun's meteoric iron dagger, also known as Tutankhamun's iron dagger and King Tut's dagger, is an iron-bladed dagger from the tomb of the ancient Egyptian Pharaoh Tutankhamun (reigned c. 1334–1325 BC). As the blade composition and homogeneity closely correlate with meteorite composition and homogeneity, the material for the blade is determined to have originated by way of a meteoritic landing.  The dagger is currently displayed at the Egyptian Museum in Cairo.

Analysis
Since the 1960s, the high nickel content in the blade has been accepted as indicative of meteoric origin. A more recent study published in June 2016 derived from x-ray fluorescence spectrometer analysis show that the blade's composition is mostly iron (Fe) and 11% nickel (Ni) and 0.6% cobalt (Co). This means its composition is placed within the median of a group of 76 previously discovered iron meteorites.
The nickel content in the bulk metal of most iron meteorites ranges from 5% to 35%, whereas it never exceeds 4% in historical iron artifacts from terrestrial ores produced before the 19th century.
Also, the nickel to cobalt ratio of this blade is comparable to that of iron meteorite materials.

At the time of King Tutankhamun's mummification in approximately 1323 BC (the Bronze Age), iron smelting and manufacture were rare. Iron objects were used for only artistic, ornamental, ritual, gift giving, and ceremonial purposes as well as for pigmentation. Hence, iron during this age was more valuable or precious than gold. Iron artifacts were given as royal gifts during the period directly preceding Tutankhamun's rule (i.e., during the reign of Amenhotep III).

Scholars' obstacles
Determining iron's occurrence throughout the very ancient past – such as obtaining, smelting, and introducing into various civilizations – has been an ongoing topic of scholarly study and discussion. From the late Neolithic era to the Bronze Age, ancient Eastern Mediterranean cultures used iron infrequently. The existence of smelted iron objects during this period has been shown to be uncommon or rare, and believed to have been produced from the ore found in meteorites. However, iron working methods and iron's uses, and its dispersion and circulation within prehistoric societies, are contentious issues within the scientific community due to gaps in knowledge and data. These debates have included the presumed meteoritic source as the material from which the iron dagger blade is made.

Additionally, it has always been difficult to obtain permission to test ancient Egyptian artifacts, including the destructive testing of minuscule samples and non-destructive testing.

Advancements in technologies used for deeper analysis of artifacts were required, which has happened over the last twenty years. Hence, during "the last 20 years, a dramatic improvement in solid-state detectors technology has allowed new analytical applications". Therefore, state of the art X-ray fluorescence spectrometers, a method of nondestructive testing, now typically exhibit improved deconstruction capabilities resulting in more accurately resolving the chemical composition of targeted artifacts into data that describes their constituent elements. The particular spectrometers used in this now well-known study are portable and handheld.

Historical background
No Egyptian archaeological evidence exists of iron smelting until the 6th century BC. The earliest known example of the use of metallic iron in Egypt dates to approximately 3400 BC. This corresponds to the prehistoric time before Egypt became a single state ruled by a pharaoh.

Metallic beads
Metallic beads and other precious stones were strung across the waist and neck of an entombed man at a grave site in the Gerzeh cemetery, 70 kilometers south of modern Cairo.

Soon after the beads' discovery in 1911, scientific analysis revealed the beads to be nickel rich. As all meteorite iron is nickel rich this indicated a meteoritic origin. However, in the 1980s strong doubts developed after suggestions from archaeo-metallurgists that some early examples of nickel rich iron were produced by the use of terrestrial nickel rich iron ores . To establish meteorite provenance more refined analysis was needed.

In 2013, a single bead from the Manchester Museum (UK) was photographed, subjected to a scanning electron microscope to reveal the bead's micro-structure and chemistry. Also a CT scan (or type of x-ray) of the bead was conducted. The results indicated the beads' micro-structures and composition were consistent with that of an iron meteorite that had been worked into a small thin sheet and bent into a tube-shaped bead. Hence, "for the first time using modern technology researchers recorded conclusive proof that the earliest known use of iron by Egyptians was from a meteorite."

Tutankhamun
Nineteen iron objects were discovered in the tomb of Tutankhamun, including a set of blades which appear very similar to those used in the Egyptian opening of the mouth ceremony (a ritual performed for the benefit of the deceased to enable an afterlife). These blades are also intricately linked to iron and stars, being described in temple inventories as composed of iron and were themselves frequently referred to as the stars.

The other iron objects were wrapped with Tutankhamun's mummy; these include a miniature headrest contained inside the golden death mask, an amulet attached to a golden bracelet and a dagger blade with gold haft. All were made by relatively crude methods with the exception of the dagger blade which is clearly expertly produced.

This suggests that the dagger was probably imported to Egypt perhaps as a royal gift from a neighboring territory (the Amarna letters describe an iron blade gifted to Egypt by a Mitanni king), indicating that at this time Egypt's knowledge and skills of iron production were relatively limited. Only further analytical testing can confirm if all of these artifacts are made from meteorite iron but they do appear to suggest that iron was a material used to indicate high status at the time of Tutankhamun's death in approximately 1327 BC.

See also
Meteoric iron

References

Further reading
 
 

14th-century BC works
1925 archaeological discoveries
Ancient Near East weapons
Ancient weapons
Archaeological discoveries in Egypt
Daggers
Egyptian Museum
Individual weapons
Meteorites
Tutankhamun